This is a list of the 558 MPs or Members of Parliament elected to the 314 constituencies of the Parliament of Great Britain at the 1768 British general election, the 13th Parliament of Great Britain and their replacements returned at subsequent by-elections, arranged by constituency.



By-elections 
List of Great Britain by-elections (1754–74)

See also
1768 British general election
List of parliaments of Great Britain
Unreformed House of Commons

References

1768
 
1768 in Great Britain
Lists of Members of the Parliament of Great Britain